New Yorker or variant primarily refers to:
 A resident of the State of New York
 Demographics of New York (state)
 A resident of New York City
 List of people from New York City
 The New Yorker, a magazine founded in 1925
 The New Yorkers, a 1930 musical by Cole Porter

New Yorker or variant may also refer to:
 New Yorker (clothing), a German fashion company
 New Yorker Films
 The New Yorker (fireboat), a 1890 large fireboat operated by the FDNY
 The New Yorker (1833–1841), predecessor to the New-York Tribune
 The New Yorker (1901–1906), a weekly newspaper edited by Robert W. Criswell 
 Chrysler New Yorker, an automobile
 The New Yorker Radio Hour, a radio program carried by public radio stations
 New Yorker Theatre, the former name of the Studio 54 theater in New York City
 Wyndham New Yorker Hotel, in New York City

See also
 New York (disambiguation)
 Knickerbocker (disambiguation)
 Yorker
 Yorkie (disambiguation)